Odoardo Barri (13 September 1844 – January 1920) was the pseudonym of Edward Slater. He was born in Dublin and became a composer, music teacher and an oratorio singer in Italy and Spain. After working in Italy and Spain, he opened a music school in London and ran it for 50 years. He claimed to have been born in Como and that he had fought at Solferino.

His most notable composition was "The Old Brigade" with words by Frederick Weatherly. His other works include a Mass for the King of Spain and about 1500 songs, including "The Shadow of the Cross", "Saved From the Storm", "The Good Shepherd", "The Armourer’s Gift" and "Birdie’s Nest". He also wrote the operettas: "M.D." (1879), "Our Amateur Theatricals" (1894) and "That Terrible Turk" (1898). Barri also worked as a theatre manager.

External links

References

Irish composers
Musicians from Dublin (city)
1844 births
1920 deaths